Tony Pignatiello (born 29 April 1968) is a retired Canadian soccer player who played at both professional and international levels as a midfielder.

Career
Pignatiello played club football for Toronto Italia, York Lions, North York Rockets, Toronto Blizzard and Nova Scotia Clippers.
Pignatiello represented Canada at the 1987 Pan American Games and at the 1987 FIFA World Youth Championship. 

Pignatiello earned twelve caps for the Canadian national side in 1988, scoring one goal.

References

1968 births
Living people
Soccer players from Toronto
Canada men's international soccer players
Canadian Soccer League (1987–1992) players
Canadian soccer players
Toronto Italia players
North York Rockets players
Toronto Blizzard (1986–1993) players
Nova Scotia Clippers players
Canada men's youth international soccer players
Canadian National Soccer League players
Association football midfielders
Pan American Games competitors for Canada
Footballers at the 1987 Pan American Games
Hamilton Steelers (1981–1992) players